Phosphorus trisulfide may refer to:

 Phosphorus sesquisulfide
 Diphosphorus trisulfide